The Most Esteemed Order of the Defender of the Realm is a Malaysian federal award presented for meritorious service to the country.  The Order Motto are 'Dipeliharakan Allah-Pangkuan Negara' (By the Grace of God-Defender of the Realm).

The order was instituted on 6 August 1958 and initially had the five highest ranks. The medal was added on 19 August 1960.

Order ranks 

The order has six ranks:

Grand Commander 

 Grand Commander of the Order of the Defender of the Realm (S.M.N.). 

This rank is limited to 25 living recipients at any time, except foreign citizens who are conferred honorary awards.  The recipient of this award receives the title Tun  and his wife Toh Puan.

The collar comprises the crests of the states in Malaysia with an eleven-pointed star made of gold-plated silver. The ribbon is of dark blue silk and has yellow stripes on both the edges. It has a central white stipe, charged with a smaller red stripe in its middle.

Commander 

 Commander of the Order of the Defender of the Realm (P.M.N.)

It is limited to 75 living recipients at any time, excluding foreign citizens who are conferred honorary awards.  The recipient of this award receives the title Tan Sri and the recipient's wife takes the title of Puan Sri.

The Star is made of gold-plated silver and so is the badge but smaller in size. The ribbon has white stripes on both the edges and red stripes in the centre. The red stripes lie on the yellow stripes. The end of the ribbon is tied with a ribbon and the badge suspends from below the ribbon.

Companion 

 Companion of the Order of the Defender of the Realm (J.M.N.)

Living recipients are limited to 700 only at any time, excluding foreign citizens who receive it as an honorary award. It does not carry any title. 

The badge of the Johan Mangku Negara is an eleven-pointed star made of gold-plated silver. Each point is white and in between are a star and crescent moon. They are made of gold-plated silver. In the centre of the star is a white circle decorated with carvings of the Malaysian Royal Crown. The badge has a radius of 2¼ inches. It suspends from a ribbon which is of the same colour as that of the Grand Commander of the Order of the Defender of the Realm but has narrower stripes. The badge is worn around the neck. The badge for women has a ribbon which is tied in a bow. The badge suspends from the bow and is pinned to the chest.

Officer 

 Officer of the Order of the Defender of the Realm (K.M.N.)

There is no limit to the number of persons to be awarded this honour. It can also be conferred on foreign citizens as an honorary award. It does not carry any title. 

The badge of the Kesatria Mangku Negara is similar in shape as that of the Johan Mangku Negara. It has a radius of 2 inches. The badge suspends from a riband measuring 1½ inches. The ribbon is of the same colour as that of the Johan Setia Negara. There is a kris on the ribbon, upright with its blade pointing downward. The kris is enclosed in a circle. The badge is pinned on the chest. For the women, the ribbon is tied in a bow and the badge suspends from below the knot of the bow. The kris in the circle is pinned on the bow of the ribbon.

Member 

 Member of the Order of the Defender of the Realm (A.M.N.)

There is no limit to the number to be awarded this honour. It can also be conferred on foreign citizens as an honorary award.

The design the badge is the same as that of the Darjah Kesatria Mangku Negara but the kris lies in the centre. The badge has a radius of 1¾ inches. It is pinned to the chest. It suspends from a riband which is of the same colour as that of the Kesatria Mangku Negara. For women, the riband is tied in a bow and the badge suspends from below the centre of the bow.

Medal 

 Medal of the Order of the Defender of the Realm (P.P.N.)

There is no limit to the number to be honored with this award. It can also be conferred on foreign citizens as an honorary award. It does not carry any title.

The Pangkuan Negara medal is round and made of silver. On the surface is a carving of the Malaysian Royal Crown. The slogan DIPELIHARAKAN ALLAH is surmounted on the Crown. The alphabets are in Roman and Jawi. Under the Malaysian Royal Crown is another inscription, PANGKUAN NEGARA, also in Roman and Jawi alphabets. At the back of the badge is the Federal Crest with the inscription JASA CEMERLANG in Roman and Jawi. The badge suspends from a ribbon, which is of the same shape and colour as that of the Ahli Mangku Negara and is about 1½ inches wide.

Recipients
Official source

Grand Commanders (S.M.N.)
The grand commander receives the title Tun and his wife Toh Puan.

 1958: Tunku Kurshiah
 1958: Tunku Ismail
 1958: Tunku Munawir
 1958: Tengku Yahya Petra
 1958: Leong Yew Koh
 1958: Raja Uda
 1958: Tan Cheng Lock
 1959: Abdul Razak Hussein
 1959: Henry Lee Hau Shik
 1959: Tengku Budriah
 1961: Abdul Malek Yusuf
 1963: Yusof Ishak, Yang di-Pertuan Negara of Singapore (later President of the Republic of Singapore)
 1964: Abang Openg
 1964: Mustapha Harun
 1967: Pengiran Ahmad Raffae
 1968: Syed Sheh Shahabudin
 1970: Syed Sheh Barakbah
 1970: Tuanku Bujang
 1970: Sharifah Rodziah Barakbah
 1972: Abdul Aziz Abdul Majid
 1975: Fuad Stephens
 1976: Sardon Jubir
 1976: Syed Zahiruddin
 1977: Mohd Hamdan Abdullah
 1978: Abang Muhammad Salahuddin
 1978: Ahmad Koroh
 1979: Mohamad Adnan Robert
 1981: Hussein Onn, 3rd Prime Minister of Malaysia
 1982: Abdul Rahman Ya'kub
 1982: Awang Hassan
 1987: Sultan Ibrahim Ismail, Sultan of Johor
 1989: Ahmad Zaidi Adruce
 1989: Hamdan Sheikh Tahir
 1989: Mohammad Said Keruak
 1989: Syed Ahmad Shahabuddin
 1996: Sakaran Dandai
 2003: Ahmadshah Abdullah
 2003: Mahathir Mohamad, 4th and 7th Prime Minister of Malaysia
 2004: Mohd Khalil Yaakob, Yang di-Pertua Negeri of Melaka
 2009: Abdullah Ahmad Badawi, 5th Prime Minister of Malaysia
 2011: Juhar Mahiruddin, Yang di-Pertua Negeri of Sabah
 2014: Abdul Taib Mahmud, Yang di-Pertua Negeri of Sarawak
 2020: Mohd Ali Rustam, Yang di-Pertua Negeri of Melaka
 2021: Ahmad Fuzi Abdul Razak, Yang di-Pertua Negeri of Penang

Commanders (P.M.N.)
The commander receives the title Tan Sri and his wife Puan Sri.

Honorary recipients

Honorary Grand Commanders (S.M.N. (K))
The honorary grand commander also receives the title Tun and his wife Toh Puan.

 1958: Lim Yew Hock, Chief Minister of Singapore 
 1959: Djuanda Kartawidjaja, Prime Minister of Indonesia
 1960: Gerald Templer, British High Commissioner in Malaya
 1962: Thanat Khoman, Foreign Minister of Thailand
 1962: Thanom Kittikachorn, Prime Minister of Thailand
 1963: Norodom Monineath, Queen consort of Cambodia
 1964: Dhani Nivat, Member of the Thai Royal Family
 1964: Hayato Ikeda, Prime Minister of Japan
 1964: Masayoshi Ōhira, Foreign Minister of Japan
 1964: Norodom Kantol, Prime Minister of Cambodia
 1964: Prapas Charusathien, Commander in Chief of the Royal Thai Army
 1964: Wan Waithayakon, Member of the Thai Royal Family
 1965: Abdel Hakim Amer, Vice President of Egypt
 1965: Ali Sabri, Vice President of Egypt
 1965: Anwar Sadat, Vice President of Egypt
 1965: Zein al-Sharaf Talal, Queen Mother of Jordan
 1965: Firyal, Spouse of Muhammad bin Talal
 1965: Hassan bin Talal, Crown Prince of Jordan
 1965: Hassan Ibrahim, Vice President of Egypt
 1965: Hussein el-Shafei, Vice President of Egypt
 1965: Chung Il-kwon, Prime Minister of South Korea
 1965: Muhammad bin Talal, Member of the Jordanian Royal Family
 1965: Muna al-Hussein, Princess Consort of Jordan
 1965: Nguyễn Cao Kỳ, Prime Minister of Vietnam
 1965: Hussein ibn Nasser, Prime Minister of Jordan
 1965: Wasfi al-Tal, Prime Minister of Jordan
 1965: Zakaria Mohieddin, Vice President of Egypt
 1966: Chang Kay Young
 1966: James Beveridge Thomson, Lord President of the Federal Court of Malaysia
 1967: Albert II, Member of the Belgian Royal Family
 1967: Eisaku Satō, Prime Minister of Japan
 1970: Adam Malik, Foreign Minister of Indonesia
 1970: Nawwaf bin Abdulaziz Al Saud, Member of the House of Saud
 1971: Souvanna Phouma, Prime Minister of Laos
 1975: Kukrit Pramoj, Prime Minister of Thailand
 1979: Kriangsak Chamanan, Prime Minister of Thailand
 1982: Fahd bin Abdulaziz Al Saud, Crown Prince of Saudi Arabia
 1984: Elena Ceaușescu, First Lady of Romania
 1984: Prem Tinsulanonda, Prime Minister of Thailand
 1989: Jefri Bolkiah, Member of the Bruneian Royal Family
 1995: Victoria, Crown Princess of Sweden
 2000: Maha Vajiralongkorn, Crown Prince of Thailand
 2000: Sultan bin Abdulaziz Al Saud, Member of the House of Saud
 2001: Khalifa bin Salman Al Khalifa, Prime Minister of Bahrain
 2003: Abdullah bin Abdulaziz Al Saud, Crown Prince of Saudi Arabia
 2003: Marcello Pera, President of the Italian Senate
 2003: Pier Ferdinando Casini, President of the Italian Chamber of Deputies
 2005: Victoria, Crown Princess of Sweden
 2010: Moza bint Nasser, Consort to the Emir of Qatar
 2011: Mohamed bin Zayed Al Nahyan, Crown Prince of Abu Dhabi
 2012: Naruhito, Crown Prince of Japan
 2012: Masako, Crown Princess of Japan

Honorary Commanders (P.M.N. (K))

The honorary commander were also receives the title Tan Sri and his wife Puan Sri.

References

External links 
 Malaysia: Most Distinguished Order of the Defender of the Realm

 
Defender of the Realm
Defender of the Realm, Order of the
Awards established in 1958
1958 establishments in Malaya